Centrex Europe Energy and Gas AG is "an international group of companies operating in the natural gas sector, focussing on the extraction and marketing of natural gas reserves". It is believed to be a Gazprom front company.

An author suggests that the shadowy companies might be related to "means of silently funneling money for high level Russian and Austrian officials into Liechtenstein and other off-shore accounts".

A U.S. Senate testimony, overseen by Sen. Joe Biden, noted:

Owners
 GH Gas Holdings, Ltd. in Cyprus.
 RN Privatstiftung in Austria — (Robert Nowikovsky).

See also

 List of Gazprom's subsidiaries

References

External links
 Website
 Gazprom’s European Web. The Jamestown Foundation. February 2009
 A tale of gazoviki, money and greed - Dubious methods and shady partners. Stern magazine, September 13, 2007

Gazprom subsidiaries
Oil and gas companies of Austria
Oil and gas companies of Cyprus